Draper House is a historic home located at Lima in Livingston County, New York. It was built about 1842 and remodeled in the 1860s.  It is a two-story, three bay, side hall frame residence with vernacular Italianate style design features.

It was listed on the National Register of Historic Places in 1989.

References

Houses on the National Register of Historic Places in New York (state)
Houses completed in 1842
Houses in Livingston County, New York
National Register of Historic Places in Livingston County, New York